St. Peter is the 8th District of Graz, in Styria, Austria.
Its area is 8.86 km2.
Its population is 14,179  ''(01.01.2008)

Its Postal Codes are:  8010, 8041, 8042, 8051.